Antonio Félix "Tota" Carbajal Rodríguez (born 7 June 1929) is a Mexican former professional footballer who played as a goalkeeper. He was also called "El Cinco Copas", in reference to his record of five World Cups played. As of January 2023, Carbajal is the last surviving player from the 1950 World Cup.

Club career
Born in Mexico City, Carbajal became a professional footballer with the local Club España in 1948, after having been in the squad that participated at the Olympic tournament in 1948. After the disappearance of España in 1950, he joined Club León, where he would remain until the end of his career.

International career
Carbajal made his international debut in the Maracanã Stadium in Rio de Janeiro on June 24, 1950, against World Cup hosts Brazil. He was the youngest goalkeeper to play in that tournament. He appeared in one match at the 1954 World Cup and in three at the 1958 tournament; at the 1962 World Cup in Chile, he became the first footballer ever to appear in four World Cups, also helping his team win its first ever World Cup match when they defeated Czechoslovakia 3–1 in the first round. Four years later Carbajal established another mark with his fifth World Cup appearance. That record was equaled by German player Lothar Matthäus in 1998 and by his compatriot Rafael Márquez in 2018 and in 2022 by Argentine Lionel Messi,  Portuguese Cristiano Ronaldo and two more of his compatriots, Guillermo Ochoa and Andrés Guardado. In 2015 Homare Sawa and Formiga became the first footballers to appear for a record sixth time at the 2015 FIFA Women's World Cup in Canada. In total, Carbajal appeared in 48 international matches for Mexico. In 11 World Cup matches from 1950 to 1966, he conceded 25 goals, a record that was tied by Saudi goalkeeper Mohamed Al-Deayea in 2002.

Management career
After retiring as a player, he became a manager along 1960s, 1970s, 1980s and 1990s with Club León, Unión de Curtidores, Atletas Campesinos and Atlético Morelia. He twice won both the Copa México as Campeón de Campeones with Club Leon in the early 1970s. Then he managed Unión de Curtidores in the only two seasons this club advanced to play-offs, and was awarded as Primera División's best coach one time. He achieved the championship in Segunda División with Atletas Campesinos in partnership with Antonio Ascencio. He managed Morelia for 10 years.

Statistics

1Includes results from season 1969-1970 Primera División de México & cup tournament
2Includes only results from 1970 to 1971 & 1971-72 Primera División de México (regular seasons and play-offs), cup tournaments and Campeón de Campeones. It does not include results from Torneo México 70 and 1972-73 Primera División de México's season
3Includes results from Primera División de México (regular seasons and play-offs) and cup tournaments
4Includes only results from 1978 to 1979 Primera División de México. It does not include results from 1979 to 1980 Primera División de México
5Includes only eight play-offs results from Segunda División de México
6Includes results from Primera División de México (regular seasons and play-offs), cup tournaments and 1988 CONCACAF Championship

Honours

Player
León
Primera División: 1951–52, 1955–56
Copa México: 1957–58
Campeón de Campeones: 1955–56

Individual
IFFHS CONCACAF Men's Team of All Time: 2021

Manager
León
Copa México: 1970–71, 1971–72
Campeón de Campeones: 1970–71, 1971–72

Atletas Campesinos
Segunda División: 1979–80

Individual
Citlalli Trophy (Best Coach): 1975-76

References

External links

1929 births
Living people
Association football goalkeepers
Mexican football managers
Olympic footballers of Mexico
Footballers at the 1948 Summer Olympics
1950 FIFA World Cup players
1954 FIFA World Cup players
1958 FIFA World Cup players
1962 FIFA World Cup players
1966 FIFA World Cup players
Mexico international footballers
Club León footballers
Footballers from Mexico City
Atlético Morelia managers
Real Club España footballers
Liga MX players
Mexican footballers